Great Yarmouth, often called Yarmouth, is a seaside town and unparished area in, and the main administrative centre of, the Borough of Great Yarmouth in Norfolk, England; it straddles the River Yare and is located  east of Norwich. A population of 38,693 in the 2011 Census made it Norfolk's third most populous. Its fishing industry, mainly for herring, shrank after the mid-20th century and has all but ended. North Sea oil from the 1960s supplied an oil-rig industry that services offshore natural gas rigs; more recently, offshore wind power and other renewable energy industries have ensued. 

Yarmouth has been a resort since 1760 and a gateway from the Norfolk Broads to the North Sea. Holiday-making rose when a railway opened in 1844, bringing easier, cheaper access and some new settlement. Wellington Pier opened in 1854 and Britannia Pier in 1858. Through the 20th century, Yarmouth boomed as a resort, with a promenade, pubs, trams, fish-and-chip shops, theatres, the Pleasure Beach, the Sea Life Centre, the Hippodrome Circus, the Time and Tide Museum and a Victorian seaside Winter Garden in cast iron and glass.

Geography and demography
The town itself is on a  spit of land between the North Sea and River Yare. It features historic rows of houses in narrow streets and a main tourist sector on the seafront. It is linked to Gorleston, Cobholm and Southtown by Haven Bridge and to the A47 and A149 by Breydon Bridge. It is the main town in the Borough of Great Yarmouth.

The ONS identifies a Great Yarmouth urban area with a population of 68,317, including the sub-areas of Caister-on-Sea (8,756) and Great Yarmouth (58,032). The wider Great Yarmouth borough had a population of around 92,500, which increased to 97,277 at the 2011 census. Ethnically, Great Yarmouth was 92.8 per cent White British, with the next biggest ethnic demographic being Other White at 3.5 per cent – Eastern Europeans in the main.

History

Great Yarmouth (Gernemwa, Yernemuth) lies near the site of the Roman fort camp of Gariannonum at the mouth of the River Yare. Its situation having attracted fishermen from the Cinque Ports, a permanent settlement was made, and the town numbered 70 burgesses before the Norman Conquest. Henry I placed it under the rule of a reeve.

In 1101 the Church of St Nicholas was founded by Herbert de Losinga, the first Bishop of Norwich, and consecrated in 1119. This was to be the first of several priories founded in what was a wealthy trading centre of considerable importance. In 1208, King John granted a charter to Great Yarmouth. The charter gave his burgesses of Yarmouth general liberties according to the customs of Oxford, a gild merchant and weekly hustings, amplified by several later charters asserting the rights of the borough against Little Yarmouth and Gorleston. The town is bound to send to the sheriffs of Norwich every year one hundred herrings, baked in twenty four pasties, which the sheriffs are to deliver to the lord of the manor of East Carlton who is then to convey them to the King.

A hospital was founded in Great Yarmouth in the reign of Edward I by Thomas Fastolfe, father of Thomas Fastolf, Bishop of St David's. In 1551, a grammar school founded and the great hall of the old hospital was appropriated for its use. The school was closed from 1757 to 1860, but re-established by charity trustees and settled in new buildings in 1872.

In 1552 Edward VI granted a charter of admiralty jurisdiction, later confirmed and extended by James I. Elizabeth I came to Great Yarmouth in July 1578. In 1668 Charles II incorporated Little Yarmouth into the borough by a charter with one brief exception remaining in force until 1703, when Queen Anne replaced the two bailiffs by a mayor. In 1673, during the Third Anglo-Dutch War, the Zealand Expedition was assembled in the town. In 1702 the Fishermen's Hospital was founded. In the early 18th century, Yarmouth, as a thriving herring port, was vividly and admiringly described several times in Daniel Defoe's travel journals, in part as follows:
Yarmouth is an ancient town, much older than Norwich; and at present, tho' not standing on so much ground, yet better built; much more compleat; for number of inhabitants, not much inferior; and for wealth, trade, and advantage of its situation, infinitely superior to Norwich.

It is plac'd on a peninsula between the River Yare and the sea; the two last lying parallel to one another, and the town in the middle: The river lies on the west-side of the town, and being grown very large and deep, by a conflux of all the rivers on this side the county, forms the haven; and the town facing to the west also, and open to the river, makes the finest key in England, if not in Europe, not inferior even to that of Marseilles itself.

The ships ride here so close, and as it were, keeping up one another, with their head-fasts on shore, that for half a mile [800 m] together, they go cross the stream with their bolsprits over the land, their bowes, or heads, touching the very wharf; so that one may walk from ship to ship as on a floating bridge, all along by the shore-side: The key reaching from the drawbridge almost to the south-gate, is so spacious and wide, that in some places 'tis near one hundred yards from the houses to the wharf. In this pleasant and agreeable range of houses are some very magnificent buildings, and among the rest, the custom-house and town-hall, and some merchants houses, which look like little palaces, rather than the dwelling-houses of private men.

The greatest defect of this beautiful town, seems to be, that tho' it is very rich and encreasing in wealth and trade, and consequently in people, there is not room to enlarge the town by building; which would be certainly done much more than it is, but that the river on the land-side prescribes them, except at the north end without the gate....

In 1797, during the French Revolutionary Wars, the town was the main supply base for the North Sea Fleet. The fleet collected at the Yarmouth Roads, from whence it sailed to the decisive Battle of Camperdown against the Dutch fleet.

Again in 1807, during the Napoleonic Wars, the collected fleet sailed from the roadstead to the Battle of Copenhagen.

From 1808 to 1814 the Admiralty in London could communicate with its ships in Yarmouth by a shutter telegraph chain. Ships were routinely anchored offshore during the Napoleonic Wars and the town served as a supply base for the Royal Navy. Part of an Ordnance Yard survives from this period on Southtown Road, probably designed by James Wyatt: a pair of roadside lodges (which originally housed senior officers) frame the entrance to the site, which contains a sizeable armoury of 1806, a small barracks block and other ancillary buildings. Originally the depot extended down to a wharf on the River Yare and was flanked by a pair of storehouses, but these and other buildings were destroyed in The Blitz. A grander survival is the former Royal Naval Hospital designed by William Pilkington, begun in 1806 and opened in 1811. Consisting of four colonnaded blocks around a courtyard, it served as a naval psychiatric hospital, then as a barracks. The barrack-master was Captain George Manby, during his time in post he invented the Manby mortar. The premises was transferred to the NHS in 1958. After its closure in 1993, the buildings were turned into private residences.

The town was the site of a bridge disaster and drowning tragedy on 2 May 1845, when the Yarmouth suspension bridge crowded with children collapsed under the weight killing 79. They had gathered to watch a clown in a barrel being pulled by geese down the river. As he passed under the bridge the weight shifted, causing the chains on the south side to snap, tipping over the bridge deck.

Great Yarmouth had an electric tramway system from 1902 to 1933. From the 1880s until the First World War, the town was a regular destinations for Bass Excursions, when 15 trains would take 8000–9000 employees of Bass's Burton brewery on an annual trip to the seaside.

During World War I Great Yarmouth suffered the first aerial bombardment in the UK, by Zeppelin L3 on 19 January 1915. That same year on 15 August, Ernest Martin Jehan became the first and only man to sink a steel submarine with a sail-rigged Q-ship, off the coast of Great Yarmouth. It was bombarded by the German Navy on 24 April 1916.

The town suffered Luftwaffe bombing during World War II as the last significant place Germans could drop bombs before returning home, but much is left of the old town, including the original  protective medieval wall, of which two-thirds has survived. Of the 18 towers, 11 are left. On the South Quay is a 17th-century Merchant's House, as well as Tudor, Georgian and Victorian buildings. Behind South Quay is a maze of alleys and lanes known as "The Rows". Originally there were 145. Despite war damage, several have remained.

The town was badly affected by the North Sea flood of 1953. More recent flooding has also been a problem, with four floods in 2006, the worst being in September.

On 1 April 1974 the civil parish of Great Yarmouth was abolished.

The southern section of the  A47 Great Yarmouth Western Bypass opened in May 1985, with the northern section opened in March 1986. The bypass was re-numbered as part of the A12, until it returned to being part of the A47 in February 2017.

In February 2023, the Great Yarmouth explosion occurred in the River Yare when disposal of unexploded ordnance from World War II resulted in accidental detonation.

Sightseeing & tourism

The Tollhouse with dungeons, dating from the late 13th century, is one of Britain's oldest former gaols and oldest civic buildings. It backs onto the central library. Major sections of the medieval town walls survive around the parish cemetery and in parts of the old town.

Great Yarmouth Minster (the Minster Church of St Nicholas, founded in the 12th century as an act of penance) stands in Church Plain, just off the market place. It is the third largest parish church in England after Beverley Minster in the East Riding of Yorkshire and Christchurch Priory in Dorset. Neighbouring Church Plain has the 17th-century timber-framed house where Anna Sewell (1820–1878), author of Black Beauty, was born.

The market place, one of England's largest, has functioned since the 13th century. It is also home to the town's shopping sector and the famous Yarmouth chip stalls. The smaller area south of the market is used as a performance area for community events and for access to the town's shopping centre, Market Gates.

Great Yarmouth railway station is the terminus of the Wherry Lines from Norwich. Before the Beeching Axe, the town had a number of stations and a direct link to London down the east coast. The only remaining signs of these is a coach park, where Beach Station once was, and the A12 relief road, which follows the route of the railway down into the embankment from Breydon Bridge.

Yarmouth has two piers: Britannia Pier (Grade II listed)) and Wellington Pier. The theatre building on the latter was demolished in 2005 and reopened in 2008 as a family entertainment centre, including a ten-pin bowling alley overlooking the beach. Britannia Pier holds the Britannia Theatre, which during the summer has featured acts such as Jim Davidson, Jethro, Basil Brush, Cannon and Ball, Chubby Brown, the Chuckle Brothers, and The Searchers. It is one of the few end-of-the pier theatres surviving in England.

The Scroby Sands Wind Farm of 30 generators is within sight of the seafront, with its giant wind generators. Also visible are grey seals during their breeding season. The country's only full-time circus, Hippodrome Circus, is just off the seafront.

The Grade II listed Winter Gardens building sits next to the Wellington Pier. The cast iron, framed glass structure was shipped by barge from Torquay in 1903, ostensibly without the loss of a single pane of glass. Over the years, it has been used as ballroom, roller skating rink and beer garden. In the 1990s it was converted into a nightclub by Jim Davidson and has since been used as a family leisure venue. It is currently closed. In the meantime it has been named by the Victorian Society as a heritage building at risk of disrepair.

Great Yarmouth's seafront, known as "The Golden Mile" attracts millions of visitors each year to its sandy beaches, indoor and outdoor attractions and amusement arcades. Great Yarmouth's Marine Parade has twelve Amusement Arcades within , including: Atlantis, The Flamingo, Circus Circus, The Golden Nugget, The Mint, Leisureland, The Majestic, The Silver Slipper, The Showboat, Magic City, Quicksilver and The Gold Rush, opened in 2007. In addition to the two piers, tourist attractions on Marine Parade include Joyland, Pirates Cove Adventure Golf, Castaway Island Adventure Golf, the Marina Centre, the Sea Life Centre, Merrivale Model Village and the Pleasure Beach and Gardens.

In August 2019, the Venetian Waterways and gardens reopened. The waterways, running parallel to the main beach, were a feature constructed as a work-creation scheme in 1926–1928, consisting of canals and formal gardens, with rowing boats, pedalos and gondolas. These had been allowed to silt up, decay and become abandoned. With a grant from the Heritage Lottery Fund of £1.7m and the labour of volunteers, the flowerbeds have been restored with 20,000 plants, and the 1920s cafe has been restored. That and the boat hire are being run by a social enterprise.

The South Denes area is home to the Grade I listed Norfolk Naval Pillar, known locally as the Britannia Monument or Nelson's Monument. This tribute to Nelson was completed in 1819, 24 years before the completion of Nelson's Column in London. The monument, designed by William Wilkins, shows Britannia standing atop a globe holding an olive branch in her right hand and a trident in her left. There is a popular assumption in the town that the statue of Britannia was supposed to face out to sea but now faces inland due to a mistake during construction, although it is thought she is meant to face Nelson's birthplace at Burnham Thorpe. The monument was originally planned to mark Nelson's victory at the Battle of the Nile, but fund-raising was not completed until after his death and it was instead dedicated to England's greatest naval hero. It is currently surrounded by an industrial estate but there are plans to improve the area. The Norfolk Nelson Museum on South Quay housed the Ben Burgess collection of Nelson memorabilia and was the only dedicated Nelson museum in England. Its several galleries looked at Nelson's life and personality, and at what life was like for men who sailed under him. It closed in 2019.

Charles Dickens used Yarmouth as a key location in his novel David Copperfield, and described the town as "the finest place in the universe". The author stayed at the Royal Hotel on the Marine Parade while writing the novel.

The Time and Tide Museum in Blackfriars Road, managed by Norfolk Museums Service, was nominated in the UK Museums Awards in 2005. It was built as part of a regeneration of the south of the town in 2003. Its location in an old herring smokery harks back to the town's status as a major fishing port. Sections of the historic town wall stand opposite the museum, next to the Great Yarmouth Potteries, part of which is housed in another former smoke house. The town wall is among the most complete medieval town walls in the country, with 11 of the 18 original turrets still standing. Other museums in the town include the National Trust's Elizabethan House, the Great Yarmouth Row Houses, managed by English Heritage, and the privately owned Blitz and Pieces, based on the Home Front during World War II.

The Maritime Heritage East partnership, based at the award-winning Time and Tide Museum aims to raise the profile of maritime heritage and museum collections.

In October 2021, street artist Banksy created a number of murals in the town known as A Great British Spraycation.

Wildlife

The Yarmouth area provides habitats for a number of rare and unusual species. The area between the piers is home to one of the largest roosts of Mediterranean gulls in the UK. Breydon Water, just behind the town, is a major wader and waterfowl site, with winter roosts of over 100,000 birds. Grey seal and common seal are frequently seen offshore, as are seabirds such as gannet, little auk, common scoter, razorbill and guillemot.

This and the surrounding Halvergate Marshes are environmentally protected. Most of the area is now managed by conservation organisations, principally the RSPB. The North Denes area of the beach is an SSSI due to its dune plants, and supports numbers of skylarks and meadow pipits, along with one of the largest little tern colonies in the UK each summer, and a small colony of grayling butterflies. Other butterflies found include small copper and common blue.

The nearby cemetery is a renowned temporary roost for spring and autumn migrants. Common redstart and pied flycatcher are often seen during their migration. It has also recorded the first sightings of a number of rare insects blown in from the continent.

Sport and leisure
The main local football club is Great Yarmouth Town, known as the Bloaters, which plays in the Eastern Counties League. Its ground is at Wellesley Recreation Ground, named after Sir Arthur Wellesley, later to become the Duke of Wellington. There is strong East Anglian rivalry with Gorleston. Local football clubs are served by the Great Yarmouth and District League.

Great Yarmouth has a horse racecourse that features a chute allowing races of one mile on the straight.

Speedway racing was staged before and after the Second World War. The meetings were held at the greyhound stadium in Caister Road. The post-war team was known as the Yarmouth Bloaters, after the smoked fish. Banger and Stock car racing are also staged there.

The main Marina leisure centre, built in 1981, has a large swimming pool and conference facilities; it holds live entertainment, such as summer pantomime variety shows produced by local entertainers Hanton & Dean. The centre is run by the Great Yarmouth Sport and Leisure Trust. The Trust was set up in April 2006 to run the building as a charitable non-profit-making organisation.

At the beginning of the 2008 summer season, a world's first Segway Grand Prix was opened at the Pleasure Beach gardens.

The English Pool Association (EPA), the governing body for 8-Ball Pool in England, holds its National Finals Competitions (including Inter-County and Inter-League, singles and team competitions, and England trials) over several weekends through the year at the Vauxhall Holiday Park on the outskirts of Great Yarmouth.

Transport

Rail
The Wherry Lines link Norwich with Great Yarmouth railway station. The hourly Abellio Greater Anglia service is via Acle, or less frequently via Reedham.

Before the Beeching cuts there were four railway lines entering the town: from the north down the coast from Melton Constable to a terminus at Beach station, from the south-west from London Liverpool Street via Beccles, and from the south from Lowestoft Central via Hopton and Gorleston. The last two both terminating at South Town station. The remaining Vauxhall station was renamed Great Yarmouth in 1989. It is the sole surviving station from a former total of seventeen within the borough limits.

Bus
The bus station in Great Yarmouth is the hub for local routes beneath Market Gates Shopping Centre. The Excel X1 route operated by First Norfolk & Suffolk provides a link between Norwich and Lowestoft. also serving Norwich. Other local bus services link the suburban areas of Martham, Hemsby, Gorleston, Bradwell and Belton. These are mostly operated by First Norfolk & Suffolk.

Port and river

The River Yare cuts off Great Yarmouth from other areas of the borough such as Gorleston and Southtown and so the town's two bridges have become major transport links. Originally Haven Bridge was the only link over the river, but in the late 1980s Breydon Bridge was built to take the A12 over Breydon Water, replacing the old railway bridge of Breydon Viaduct. Both are lifting bridges, which can be raised to allow river traffic to pass through. This can result in traffic tailbacks, and the phrase "the bridge was up" has become synonymous in the town with being late for appointments.

A ferry running between the southern tip of Great Yarmouth and Gorleston provided a much shorter link between the factories on South Denes and the mostly residential areas of Gorleston, but increased running costs and the decline of industrial activity led to its closure in the early 1990s.

Since 2006, the restored pleasure steamer the Southern Belle has offered regular river excursions from the town's Haven Bridge. Built in 1925 for the Earl of Mount Edgcumbe, she is today owned by the Great Yarmouth and Gorleston Steam Packet Company Limited.

Construction work on the Great Yarmouth Outer Harbour, a deep-water harbour on the North Sea, began in June 2007 and was completed by 2009. Originally there was to be a roll-on/roll-off ferry link with Ĳmuiden, which failed to materialise. An initiative by Seamax Ferries to connect Great Yarmouth and Ijmuiden by ferry was due to start in 2008. Nor did installation of two large cranes in 2009, since removed, save plans for a container terminal, which have also been scrapped.

Lifeboat station

There has been a lifeboat at Great Yarmouth since at least 1802. Early boats were privately operated until the RNLI took over in 1857. It has a lifeboat station at Riverside Road, Gorleston from where the Trent-class lifeboat Samarbeta and B class (inshore) lifeboat Seahorse IV run.

Roadstead
The anchorage off Yarmouth known as Yarmouth Roads was seen as one of East Coast's best in the early 1800s. There fleets gathered and set sail during the Napoleonic wars. Nowadays the roadstead is more likely to be referred to as an anchorage.

Road
The town is served by the A47 and the terminating A143. Until 2017, the A12 from London terminated in Yarmouth - the route from Lowestoft was renumbered as the A47 by Highways England, as part of a wider road-improvement scheme; thereafter the A12 has terminated in Lowestoft instead of at Vauxhall roundabout. The relief road was built along the path of the old railway to carry the A12 onwards to Lowestoft and London. Roundabouts, junctions and bridges often become gridlocked at rush hour.

Proposed third river crossing
Plans have been advanced for a third river crossing in Great Yarmouth to link northern Gorleston with the South Denes and the Outer Harbour, avoiding the congested town centre. A public consultation took place in mid-2009 over four possible proposals, but by late 2010 the plans were stalled by lack of funding and closure of the container terminal. In 2016, additional funding of just over £1 million was pledged and a potential crossing proposal outlined for the crossing to link the A12 at Harfrey's Roundabout to South Denes. Public consultation dates have also been set by Norfolk County Council.

The bridge project was approved in 2020. Construction began in January 2021, and is set to end in May 2023.

Air
The North Denes Heliport north of the town is operated by CHC Helicopter. In 2011 the heliport's closure was announced, with operations moving to Norwich International Airport, but this has never occurred.

First Responder group
An East of England Ambulance Service First Responder group has been set up for the Great Yarmouth area. Made up of a group of volunteers within the community in which they live or work, they are trained to attend emergency 999 calls by the NHS Ambulance Service.

Enterprise zone
Great Yarmouth and Lowestoft Enterprise Zone was launched in April 2012. Its sites include Beacon Park and South Denes in Great Yarmouth.

Notable people
Those born, raised and/or living in Yarmouth, who have a Wikipedia page:

Earlier times
Sir John Fastolf (c. 1378–1459) prototype for Shakespeare's Falstaff, lived mainly at Caister-on-Sea, but his family had long lived at Great Yarmouth.
Joan Larke (c. 1490 – after 1529), mistress of Cardinal Thomas Wolsey and mother of his two illegitimate children

16th c.
Sir John Clere (c. 1511–1557) politician and naval commander
William Harborne (c. 1542–1617) diplomat, merchant and Ambassador to the Ottoman Empire
Edward Owner (1576–1650) politician who sat in the House of Commons at times between 1621 and 1648 
Sir John Potts, 1st Baronet (c. 1592–1673) politician who sat in the House of Commons from 1640 to 1648 and in 1660.

17th c.
William Bridge (c. 1600–1670), prominent English independent minister
Thomas Goodwin (1600–1680) Puritan theologian and preacher, chaplain to Oliver Cromwell 
Joseph Ames (1619–1695) naval commander under the Commonwealth of England 
Rebecca Nurse (1621–1692), sister of Mary Eastey and a victim of the Salem witch trials, was born in Great Yarmouth.
Mary Eastey (1634–92), victim of the Salem witch trials, was born in Great Yarmouth.
John Clipperton (1676–1722) of Clipperton Island, privateer who fought against the Spanish
Sir William Gooch, 1st Baronet (1681–1751) Governor of Virginia from 1727 to 1749 
Joseph Ames (1689–1759) bibliographer and antiquary

18th c.
Henry Swinden (1716–1772), antiquary, schoolmaster and land surveyor
James Sayers (1748–1823), caricaturist 
John Ives FRS (1751–1776), antiquary and officer of arms at the College of Arms in London
Dr Thomas Girdlestone (1758−1822), English physician and writer
Captain George William Manby FRS (1765−1854), barrack-master and inventor of marine life-saving equipment and the fire extinguisher
Mary Dawson Turner (1774–1850), artist and illustrator 
Dawson Turner FRS (1775–1858), banker, botanist and antiquary
Captain John Black (1778–1802) son of a clergyman, ship's officer and privateer
William Fisher (1780–1852) officer of the Royal Navy and a novelist
Robert Miles Sloman (1783–1867), British-German shipbuilder
Robert Gooch MD (1784–1830), physician
William Hovell (1786−1875), explorer of Australia
James Beeching (1788−1858), local shipbuilder, whose firm survived into the 20th century
Sarah Martin (1791–1843), prison visitor and philanthropist
Sir George James Turner (1798–1867), barrister, politician and judge, Lord Justice of Appeal in Chancery
Henry Stebbing FRS (1799–1883), cleric, man of letters, poet, preacher and historian

19th c.
Robert McCormick (1800–1890) Royal Navy ship's surgeon, explorer and naturalist. 
Samuel Laman Blanchard (1804–1845) author and journalist 
Charles John Palmer (1805–1888) lawyer and historian of Great Yarmouth 
John Cantiloe Joy and William Joy (1805–1859 and 1803–1865) marine artists and members of the Norwich School of painters
James Allen Ransome (1806–1875) agricultural engineer and writer on agriculture
Sir Edmund Lacon (1807–1888) Conservative politician who sat in the House of Commons between 1852 and 1885 
Sir George Edward Paget FRS (1809–1892) physician and academic
John Bell (1811–1895) sculptor
Sir James Paget (1814−1899), Victorian surgeon, after whom the James Paget University Hospital was named 
Anna Sewell (1820−1878), author of Black Beauty, was born and spent the early part of her life in Great Yarmouth.
James Haylett (1825–1907) noted lifeboatman 
Emma Maria Pearson (1828–1893) writer, one of the first British women nurses in the Red Cross
Willoughby Smith (1828–1891) electrical engineer, discovered the photoconductivity of the element selenium 
Colonel Sir Robert William Edis KBE CB (1839–1927) architect
Charles Burton Barber (1845–1894) painter, notably of children and pets
Sir G. A. H. Branson PC (1871–1951), barrister and High Court judge, grandfather of Richard Branson.
General Sir Thomas Astley Cubitt KCB, CMG, DSO (1871–1939) Army officer and Governor of Bermuda
Oliver Fellows Tomkins (1873-1901) missionary, eaten by cannibals in Papua
Reginald Edwards (1881–1925), cricketer
Captain Cuthbert Orde (1888–1968) war artist, who portrayed many RAF fighter pilots
Bandsman Jack Blake (John Blake) (1890–1960) boxer, who became British middleweight champion in 1916 
Joseph Henry Woodger (1894–1981) theoretical biologist and philosopher of biology

20th c.
William Lygon, 8th Earl Beauchamp JP DL (1903–1979) politician, MP 1929–1938 
Naomi Lewis (1911–2009) poet, essayist, critic and children's story teller
Jack Cardiff (1914−2009), Oscar-winning cinematographer
Peter Cadbury (1918–2006) founder of Westward Television 
Peter Shore (1924–2001), Labour MP and cabinet minister
Bob Grigg (1924–2002) aerospace engineer, chief designer of British Aerospace 146 
Gerald Hawkins (1928–2003) astronomer and author working on archaeoastronomy
Sir Kenneth MacMillan (1929–1992), choreographer with the Royal Ballet, Covent Garden
Richard Larn OBE (born 1931) RN Chief Petty Officer, businessman and maritime historian
John McDonnell (born 1951, in Liverpool), Labour Party politician and MP, attended Great Yarmouth Grammar School, having moved to Great Yarmouth at a young age.
Tony Wright (born 1954) Labour Party politician and MP for Great Yarmouth 1997–2010
Peter Rodulfo (born 1958) artist, sculptor and leading member of North Sea Magical Realists
Keith Chapman (born 1959) children's television writer and producer
Dale Vince OBE (born 1961) sustainable energy industrialist and New Age traveller
Jason Statham (born 1967) actor, lived in Great Yarmouth in childhood and attended the local grammar school.
Matthew Macfadyen (born 1974) actor born in Great Yarmouth
Travis Kerschen (born 1982) independent film actor

Twin towns
Great Yarmouth has been twinned with Rambouillet, France since 1956.

See also
Lydia Eva, the last surviving steam drifter of the Great Yarmouth herring fishing fleet
"Yarmouth Town", a traditional sea shanty set in the town

References

Further reading

Ferry, Kathryn (2009) "'The maker of modern Yarmouth': J. W. Cockrill", in: Kathryn Ferry, ed., Powerhouses of Provincial Architecture, 1837–1914. London: Victorian Society; pp. 45–58

External links

Official website of Great Yarmouth Borough Council

 
Towns in Norfolk
Populated coastal places in Norfolk
Seaside resorts in England
Tourism in England
Ports and harbours of Norfolk
Port cities and towns of the North Sea
Marinas in England
Staple ports
Trading posts of the Hanseatic League
Beaches of Norfolk
Market towns in Norfolk
Unparished areas in Norfolk
Former civil parishes in Norfolk
Borough of Great Yarmouth